Honeysuckle Development Corporation (HDC) was a corporation owned by the Government of New South Wales with responsibility for a major urban renewal project on the harbourside of Newcastle, the state's second-largest city.

HDC was established by the state government in 1992 to guide redevelopment of disused industrial land on the southern foreshore of Newcastle Harbour. The 50-hectare Honeysuckle site is close to the city's central business district and, although not yet fully redeveloped, already contains a mix of new residential, commercial and public buildings.

In 2007 the organisation merged with the Regional Land Management Corporation to form the Hunter Development Corporation.

References

External links
Honeysuckle Development Corporation website

Development corporations in Australia
1992 establishments in Australia
2007 disestablishments in Australia
Government agencies established in 1992
Government agencies disestablished in 2007
Government agencies of New South Wales
Companies based in Newcastle, New South Wales
Urban renewal